Betty Hutton (born Elizabeth June Thornburg; February 26, 1921 – March 11, 2007)
was an American stage, film, and television actress, comedian, dancer, and singer.

Early life and education
Hutton was born Elizabeth June Thornburg on February 26, 1921, in Battle Creek, Michigan. While she was very young, her father abandoned the family for another woman. They did not hear of him again until they received a telegram in 1937, informing them of his suicide. Betty and her older sister, Marion, were raised by her alcoholic mother, who took the surname Hutton.  Marion was later billed as the actress Sissy Jones.

The three started singing in the family's speakeasy when Betty was 3 years old. Troubles with the police kept the family on the move.  They eventually landed in Detroit, where she attended Foch Intermediate School. On one occasion, when Betty, preceded by a police escort, arrived at the premiere of Let's Dance (1950), her mother, arriving with her, quipped, "At least this time the police are in front of us!"  Hutton sang in several local bands as a teenager, and at one point visited New York City hoping to perform on Broadway, but she was turned away.

Early career
A few years later, she was scouted by orchestra leader Vincent Lopez, who gave Hutton her entry into the entertainment business.

She appeared in several musical shorts for Warner Bros., Queens of the Air (1938), Three Kings and a Queen (1939), Public Jitterbug No. 1 (1939), and One for the Book (1940).

Broadway
Hutton was cast in a Broadway show, Two for the Show (1940), which ran for 124 performances.

The show was produced by Buddy DeSylva, who then cast Hutton in Panama Hattie (1940–42). This was a major hit, running for 501 performances. It starred Ethel Merman; despite rumors through the years that Merman demanded from envy that Hutton's musical numbers be reduced from the show, more careful reports demonstrate that producer Buddy DeSylva chose to cut just one song of three, "They Ain't Done Right by Our Nell", due to Hutton's "always in overdrive" performance style.

Paramount

Early films
When DeSylva became a producer at Paramount Pictures, Hutton was signed to a featured role in The Fleet's In (1942), starring Paramount's number-one female star Dorothy Lamour, alongside Eddie Bracken and William Holden. The film was popular and Hutton was an instant hit with the moviegoing public.

Hutton was one of the many Paramount contract artists who appeared in Star Spangled Rhythm (1942). The studio did not immediately promote her to major stardom, but did give her the second lead in a Mary Martin film musical, Happy Go Lucky (1943). The response was positive, and Hutton was given co-star billing with Bob Hope in Let's Face It (1943). During that year, she made $1250 per week.

The Miracle of Morgan's Creek
In 1942, writer-director  Preston Sturges cast Betty as the dopey but endearing small-town girl who gives local troops a happy send-off and wakes up married and pregnant, but with no memory of who her husband is, except that  a few "z's" were in his name.  This film, The Miracle of Morgan's Creek, was delayed by Hays Office objections and Sturges' prolific output, and was finally released early in 1944.

The film made Hutton a major star;  Sturges was nominated for a Best Writing Oscar, the film was named to the National Film Board's Top Ten films for the year, and the National Board of Review nominated the film for Best Picture of 1944, and awarded Betty Hutton the award for Best Acting for her performance. The New York Times named it as one of the 10 Best Films of 1942–1944.

Critic James Agee noted that "the Hays office must have been raped in its sleep" to allow the film to be released. And although the Hays Office received many letters of protest because of the film's subject matter, it was Paramount's highest-grossing film of 1944, playing to standing room-only audiences in some theatres.

Paramount kept Hutton busy, putting her in And the Angels Sing (1944) with Fred MacMurray and Dorothy Lamour, and Here Come the Waves (1944) with Bing Crosby. Both were huge hits.

On the strength of Hutton's success,  she signed a recording contract with the newly formed  Capitol Records (she was one of the earliest artists to do so).

Buddy DeSylva, one of Capitol's founders, also co-produced her next hit, the musical Incendiary Blonde (1945), where she played Texas Guinan. It was directed by veteran comedy director George Marshall and Hutton had replaced Lamour as Paramount's top female box-office attraction.

Hutton was one of many Paramount stars in Duffy's Tavern (1945), and was top billed in The Stork Club (1945) with Barry Fitzgerald, produced by DeSyvla.

Hutton went into Cross My Heart (1946) with Sonny Tufts, which she disliked. She did however enjoy the hugely popular The Perils of Pauline (1947), directed by Marshall, where she sang a Frank Loesser song that was nominated for an Oscar: "I Wish I Didn't Love You So".

Hutton's relationship with Paramount began to disintegrate when DeSylva left the studio due to illness (he died in 1950). "After he left I started doing scripts that I knew weren't good for me."

Hutton made Dream Girl (1948) with MacDonald Carey, which she later said, "almost ruined me." She did Red, Hot and Blue (1949) with Victor Mature, which she also disliked.

Annie Get Your Gun

Hutton's next screen triumph came in Annie Get Your Gun (1950) for Metro-Goldwyn-Mayer, which hired her to replace Judy Garland in the role of Annie Oakley. The film, with the leading role retooled for Hutton, was a smash hit, with the biggest critical praise going to Hutton.

She was billed above Fred Astaire in the 1950 musical Let's Dance. 

Hutton was one of several stars in The Greatest Show on Earth (1952). She made an unbilled cameo in Sailor Beware (1952) with Dean Martin and Jerry Lewis, a remake of The Fleet's In, in which she portrayed Dean's girlfriend, Hetty Button.

She made Somebody Loves Me (1952), a biography of singer Blossom Seeley, with Ralph Meeker.

Hutton then clashed with Paramount. The New York Times reported that the dispute resulted from her insistence that her husband at the time, choreographer Charles O'Curran, direct her in a film.

In April 1952, Hutton returned to Broadway, performing in Betty Hutton and Her All-Star International Show.

In July 1952, she announced her husband and she would form a production company. She left Paramount in August.

Television and theatre
Hutton got work in radio, and appeared in Las Vegas, where she had a great success.

She had the rights to a script about Sophie Tucker, but was unable to raise funds.

In 1954, TV producer Max Liebman, of comedian Sid Caesar's Your Show of Shows, fashioned his first "Color Spectacular" as an original musical written especially for Hutton, Satins and Spurs.

Hutton's last completed film was a small one, Spring Reunion (1957). It was a financial disappointment. She also became disillusioned with Capitol's management and moved to RCA Victor.

In 1957, she appeared on a Dinah Shore show on NBC that also featured Boris Karloff; the program has been preserved on a kinescope.

The Betty Hutton Show
Lucille Ball and Desi Arnaz took a chance on Hutton in 1959, with their company  Desilu Productions giving her a CBS sitcom, The Betty Hutton Show. Hutton hired the still-blacklisted and future film composer Jerry Fielding to direct her series. They had met over the years in Las Vegas when he was blacklisted from TV and radio and could get no other work, and her Hollywood career was also fading. It was Fielding's first network job since losing his post as musical director of Groucho Marx's You Bet Your Life in 1953 after hostile questioning by HUAC. The Betty Hutton Show ended after 30 episodes.

Hutton continued headlining in Las Vegas and touring across the country. She returned to Broadway briefly in 1964 when she temporarily replaced a hospitalized Carol Burnett in the show Fade Out – Fade In.

She guest-starred on shows such as The Greatest Show on Earth, Burke's Law, and Gunsmoke.

In 1967, she was signed to star in two low-budget Westerns for Paramount, but was fired shortly after the projects began.

Life after Hollywood
After the 1962 death of her mother in a house fire, and the collapse of her last marriage, Hutton's depression and pill addictions escalated. She divorced her fourth husband, jazz trumpeter Pete Candoli, when she discovered he had fallen in love with Edie Adams (who would become Candoli's second wife).  She declared bankruptcy the same year.

After losing her singing voice in 1970, Hutton had a nervous breakdown and later attempted suicide. She regained control of her life through rehabilitation, and the mentorship of a Roman Catholic priest, Father Peter Maguire. Hutton converted to Roman Catholicism, and took a job as a cook at a rectory in Portsmouth, Rhode Island. She made national headlines when it was revealed she was practically penniless and working in a rectory. After an aborted comeback in 1974, she was hospitalized with emotional exhaustion. Later that year, a well-publicized "Love-In for Betty Hutton" was held at New York City's Riverboat Restaurant, emceed by comedian Joey Adams, with several old Hollywood pals on hand. The event raised $10,000 for Hutton and gave her spirits a big boost, but steady work still eluded her.

Hutton appeared in an interview with Mike Douglas and a brief guest appearance in 1975 on Baretta. In 1977, Hutton was featured on The Phil Donahue Show. She was then happily employed as hostess at a Newport, Rhode Island, jai alai arena.

She also appeared on Good Morning America, which led to a 1978 televised reunion with her two daughters. Hutton began living in a shared home with her divorced daughter and grandchildren in California, but returned to the East Coast for a three-week return to the stage.

Annie
In 1980, she took over the role of Miss Hannigan during the original Broadway production of Annie while Alice Ghostley was on vacation. Ghostley replaced the original Miss Hannigan actress, Dorothy Loudon (who won a Tony Award for the role).

Hutton's rehearsal of the song "Little Girls" was featured on Good Morning America. Hutton's Broadway comeback was also included in a profile on CBS News Sunday Morning about her life, her struggle with pills, and her recovery.

A ninth-grade drop-out, Hutton went back to school and earned a master's degree in psychology from Salve Regina University in 1986. During her time at college, Hutton became friends with singer-songwriter Kristin Hersh and attended several early concerts of Hersh's band, Throwing Muses.  Hersh later wrote the song "Elizabeth June" as a tribute to her friend, and wrote about their relationship in further detail in her memoir, Rat Girl.

Hutton's last known performance, in any medium, was on Jukebox Saturday Night, which aired on PBS in 1983. Hutton stayed in New England and began teaching comedic acting at Boston's Emerson College. She became estranged again from her daughters.

Final years
After the death of her ally, Father Maguire, Hutton returned to California, moving to Palm Springs in 1999, after decades in New England. Hutton hoped to grow closer to her daughters and grandchildren, as she told Robert Osborne on TCM's Private Screenings in April 2000, though her children remained distant. She told Osborne that she understood their hesitancy to accept a now elderly mother. The TCM interview first aired on July 18, 2000. The program was rerun as a memorial on the evening of her death in 2007, and again on July 11, 2008, April 14, 2009, January 26, 2010, and as recently as March 18, 2017. as part of TCM's memorial tribute for Robert Osborne.

Hutton lived in Palm Springs until her death March 12, 2007, at 86, from colon cancer complications. She is buried at Desert Memorial Park in Cathedral City, California.

Marriages and children

Hutton's first marriage was to camera manufacturer Ted Briskin in 1945. The marriage ended in divorce in 1951. Two daughters were born to the couple:
 Lindsay Diane Briskin, born in Los Angeles, California, on November 23, 1946
 Candice Elizabeth Briskin, born in Los Angeles, California, on April 14, 1948

Hutton's second marriage in 1952 was to choreographer Charles O'Curran. They divorced in 1955. He died in 1984.

She married husband Alan W. Livingston in 1955, weeks after her divorce from O'Curran. They divorced in 1960.

Her fourth and final marriage in 1960 was to jazz trumpeter Pete Candoli. They divorced in 1967. Hutton and Candoli had one child:
 Carolyn Candoli, born on June 19, 1962

Hutton was once engaged to the head of the Warner Bros. makeup department, makeup artist Perc Westmore, in 1942, but broke off the engagement, saying it was because he bored her.

Legacy
For her contribution to the motion picture industry, Betty Hutton has a star on the Hollywood Walk of Fame located at 6259 Hollywood Boulevard.

Hit songs

Filmography

Box-office ranking
For several years, film exhibitors voted Hutton among the leading stars in the country:
 1944 – 25th (US)
 1950 – 15th (US)
 1951 – 9th (UK)
 1952 – 14th (US), 3rd (UK)

Stage work
 Two for the Show (1940)
 Panama Hattie (1940)
 Betty Hutton and Her All-Star International Show (1952)
 Gypsy (1962)
 South Pacific (1962)
 Annie Get Your Gun (1963)
 Gentlemen Prefer Blondes (1964)
 Fade Out – Fade In (1964) (replacement for Carol Burnett)
 Mary, Mary (1965)
 Here Today (1966)
 Here Today (1972)
 Anything Goes (1973)
 Annie (1980) (replacement for Alice Ghostley)

Radio appearances

Awards and nominations

In popular culture

Her songs "He's a Demon - He's a Devil - He's a Doll" and "It's a Man" are featured in the open-world video game, Fallout 4, on the in-game radio.

Her song "Murder, He Says" appeared in Woody Allen's 1989 film, Crimes and Misdemeanors.

References

Further reading
 Betty Hutton, Backstage You Can Have: My Own Story, 2009. The Betty Hutton Estate 
 The Betty Hutton Estate, Betty Hutton Scrapbook: A Tribute To Hollywood's Blonde Bombshell, 2015. The Betty Hutton Estate 
 Gene Arceri, Rocking Horse: A Personal Biography of Betty Hutton, 2009, BearManor Media

External links

 
 
 
 BettyHuttonEstate The Betty Hutton Estate
 satinsandspurs.com The Betty Hutton Website
 Betty Hutton at who2.com
 Time magazine article, April 24, 1950
  (fan site)
 Betty Hutton at BroadwayWorld.com
 Betty Hutton at Virtual History

1921 births
2007 deaths
Actresses from Detroit
Actresses from Palm Springs, California
American film actresses
American musical theatre actresses
American stage actresses
American television actresses
Burials at Desert Memorial Park
Deaths from cancer in California
Capitol Records artists
Converts to Roman Catholicism
Deaths from colorectal cancer
Emerson College faculty
Paramount Pictures contract players
People from Battle Creek, Michigan
RCA Victor artists
Salve Regina University alumni
20th-century American singers
20th-century American actresses
20th-century American women singers
Catholics from Michigan
American women academics
21st-century American women